The Brăila Power Station is a large thermal power plant located in Brăila, having 7 generation groups, 2 of 3 MW, 1 of 210 MW, 2 of 25 MW, 1 of 50 MW and 1 of 330 MW having a total electricity generation capacity of 856 MW. The power plant also has another 210 MW unit but it is decommissioned.
Its two chimneys are 250 metres and 200 metres tall.

See also

 List of power stations in Romania

References

External links
Description 

Power station
Natural gas-fired power stations in Romania
Coal-fired power stations in Romania